Dale Shirkie (born 2 May 1995) is a Scottish footballer who plays as a forward for Darvel.

He has previously played for Motherwell, Ayr United and Troon.

Career
Dale began his career as a schoolboy with Dundee United before joining the Motherwell Academy youth set-up and then signing as a professional in 2012.

On 25 February 2014, Shirkie made his debut for Motherwell as a substitute in a 3-0 defeat to St Johnstone.

Shirkie played as a trialist for Ayr United on 9 August 2014, in a 1–0 win against Greenock Morton. Following this appearance, he signed a permanent contract with Ayr on 15 August 2014.

On 28 May 2015, Shirkie signed for Junior club Troon.

Darvel announced the signing of Shirkie on 3 July 2018.

Career statistics

References

External links
 Dale Shirkie profile at Motherwell FC official website
 

1995 births
Living people
Footballers from Irvine, North Ayrshire
Scottish footballers
Association football forwards
Motherwell F.C. players
Ayr United F.C. players
Troon F.C. players
Scottish Football League players
Scottish Professional Football League players
Scottish Junior Football Association players